The 1996 Bloc Québécois leadership election was the leadership election to replace Lucien Bouchard after he left the Bloc Québécois to become Premier of Quebec. Bloc MP Michel Gauthier won the election and became Leader of the Official Opposition. Gauthier's lack of profile resulted in some opposition parties mocking him as being the "faceless leader" of the opposition, as he was largely a political unknown in most of Canada and even in Quebec.  His leadership was unpopular with the caucus due to alleged conservative views and his lack of "charisma or authority" when compared to Bouchard. Facing a revolt by his MPs, which culminated in the leaking of confidential caucus discussions, Gauthier resigned in March 1997.

Candidates

Result

Sources

1996
1996 elections in Canada
1996 in Quebec
Bloc Québécois leadership election